Anuranjan Anand is a geneticist studying the cellular and molecular basis of human disorders.  He is a professor at Molecular Biology and Genetics Unit, and an associate faculty at Neuroscience Unit of Jawaharlal Nehru Centre for Advanced Scientific Research.

Biography and career 

Anuranjan Anand did his doctoral studies at the Indian Institute of Science., and his post-doctoral studies at the Stanford University. He joined Jawaharlal Nehru Centre for Advanced Scientific Research (JNCASR) as a faculty member in the Molecular Biology and Genetics Unit (MBGU) and later became a Professor and Chair (2009-2016) of the Unit. When the institute established the Neuroscience Unit (NSU) in 2014, he was designated as its associate faculty and was the Chair of NSU during 2016 - 2022.

Research 
During his post-doctoral studies at Stanford University, Anuranjan Anand worked with his colleagues in Bruce Baker's laboratory on the mutations of fruitless, a gene involved in sexual behavior and courtship in Drosophila melanogaster. In JNCASR, his main focus  has been on human genetic diseases with emphasis on neurological disorders, hereditary hearing loss and rare developmental disorders His laboratory has discovered several genes and mutations underlying these disorders and is currently examining their biological underpinnings employing cellular, molecular and animal modeling approaches

Honors 
Anuranjan Anand received an Outstanding Research Investigator Award from the Department of Atomic Energy in the years 2006-2010. The Department of Biotechnology awarded him the National Bioscience Award for Career Development during 2008-2011. He is an elected fellow of the Indian Academy of Sciences,   National Academy of Sciences, India, and Indian National Science Academy.

Selected bibliography

References

External links 

N-BIOS Prize recipients
Indian scientific authors
Living people
Indian geneticists
Fellows of the Indian National Science Academy
Fellows of the Indian Academy of Sciences
Fellows of The National Academy of Sciences, India
Indian Institute of Science alumni
Stanford University alumni
Scientists from Karnataka
1965 births